The orienteering events at the 2001 World Games in Akita was played between 18 and 19 August. 76 orienteers, from 11 nations, participated in the tournament. The orienteering competition took place in Iijima Forest.

Participating nations

Medal table

Events

References

External links
 International Orienteering Federation
 Orienteering on IWGA website
 Results

 
2001 World Games